Eugen Ingebretsen (30 December 1884 – 11 January 1939) was a Norwegian gymnast who competed in the 1906 Intercalated Games, in the 1908 Summer Olympics, and in the 1912 Summer Olympics.

At the 1906 Intercalated Games in Athens, he was a member of the Norwegian team, which won the gold medal in the gymnastics team event.

In 1908 he won a silver medal in the gymnastics team event with the Norwegian team. He also competed in the all-around event, but his result is unknown.

Four years later he was part of the Norwegian gymnastics team, which won the bronze medal in the gymnastics men's team, Swedish system event.

References

External links 
 
 
 

1884 births
1939 deaths
Norwegian male artistic gymnasts
Olympic gymnasts of Norway
Olympic gold medalists for Norway
Olympic silver medalists for Norway
Olympic bronze medalists for Norway
Olympic medalists in gymnastics
Medalists at the 1906 Intercalated Games
Medalists at the 1908 Summer Olympics
Medalists at the 1912 Summer Olympics
Gymnasts at the 1906 Intercalated Games
Gymnasts at the 1908 Summer Olympics
Gymnasts at the 1912 Summer Olympics
20th-century Norwegian people